Kanekalon could refer to:

 Synthetic fibers produced by Kaneka Corporation
 Synthetic dreads or other synthetic hair products made out of such material